Roberta Weiss (born November 15, 1961 in Medicine Hat, Alberta, Canada) is a Canadian actress. She sometimes works professionally as Roberta Bizeau. Weiss played Flame Beaufort on NBC's soap opera Santa Barbara. Weiss is Jewish.

Career
Weiss enrolled in the Manitoba School of Theatre and Allied Arts at the age of 16, later moving to Toronto to study theatre arts at York University. She gained national attention in Canada in an advertising campaign for Crispy Crunch. In 1986 she starred in the movie High Stakes. In 1988 Weiss appeared as a scantily-clad island girl in the controversial cult French sex-comedy film Mangeuses d'Hommes. She also played the lead in the controversial film How to Make Love to a Negro Without Getting Tired, which Peter Rainier of the Los Angeles Times called "a flat parody." Weiss played "incendiary con artist" Flame Beaufort on NBC's soap opera Santa Barbara from 1990 to 1991, and later appeared in Family Passions, a soap opera produced in Canada with German funding.

Personal life
Weiss married her Santa Barbara co-star Roscoe Born on September 30, 1994.

References

External links
 

American television actresses
American soap opera actresses
Living people
1961 births
21st-century American women